Gadzhikara may refer to:
 Aygeshat, Aragatsotn, Armenia, formerly called Gadzhikara
Lerrnapat, Armenia, formerly called Gadzhikara